Holding period risk is a financial risk that a firm's sales quote giving a potential retail client a certain time to sign the offer for a commodity, will actually be a financial disadvantage for the offering firm since the market price's on the wholesale market has changed. The risk is usually reduced by a risk premium being added onto the wholesale price of a commodity by the offering firm.

An alternative and less general definition is: Holding period risk is the risk, while holding a bond, that a better opportunity will present itself that you may be unable to act upon.

References 

Market risk